Trinity Bay North is a town in the Canadian province of Newfoundland and Labrador. It is located at the northern tip of Trinity Bay. The town had a population of 1,649 in the Canada 2021 Census.

History 
Trinity Bay North was incorporated in 2005 with the amalgamation of the towns of Catalina, Melrose, and Port Union. The town of Little Catalina later joined the municipality in an annexation.

Demographics 

Government 
The mayor of Trinity Bay North is David Bartlett.

See also
 List of cities and towns in Newfoundland and Labrador

References

 
Populated places in Newfoundland and Labrador
Towns in Newfoundland and Labrador